A tracking and data relay satellite (TDRS) is a type of communications satellite that forms part of the Tracking and Data Relay Satellite System (TDRSS) used by NASA and other United States government agencies for communications to and from independent "User Platforms" such as satellites, balloons, aircraft, the International Space Station, and remote bases like the Amundsen-Scott South Pole Station. This system was designed to replace an existing worldwide network of ground stations that had supported all of NASA's crewed flight missions and uncrewed satellites in low-Earth orbits. The primary system design goal was to increase the amount of time that these spacecraft were in communication with the ground and improve the amount of data that could be transferred.

The first seven TDRSS satellites were built by the TRW corporation. The three later versions have been manufactured by the Boeing corporation's Satellite Systems division. Thirteen satellites have been launched; however, one was destroyed in the Challenger disaster. TDRS-1 was decommissioned in October 2009. TDRS-4 was decommissioned in December 2011.  Ten TDRSS satellites are currently in service. All of the TDRSS satellites have been managed by NASA's Goddard Space Flight Center. The contract for TDRS versions L & K was awarded to Boeing on December 20, 2007. On November 30, 2011, NASA announced the decision to order an additional third-generation TDRS satellite, TDRS M.

Operations
The first tracking and data relay satellite was launched in 1983 on the Space Shuttle Challenger's first flight, STS-6. The Boeing-built Inertial Upper Stage that was to take the satellite from Challenger's orbit to its ultimate geosynchronous orbit suffered a failure that caused it not to deliver the TDRS to the correct orbit. As a result, it was necessary to command the satellite to use its onboard rocket thrusters to move it into its correct orbit. This expenditure of fuel reduced its capability to remain in a geostationary orbit; by late 1997 the orbit had changed to the point that the satellite was able to see the South Pole, and an uplink/downlink station was installed at Amundsen–Scott South Pole Station in January 1998; TDRS-1 was an important communication uplink for Antarctic research until 2009.

The second tracking and data relay satellite was destroyed along with Challenger shortly after launch during the STS-51-L mission in January 1986.  The next five TRW-built TDRSS satellites were successfully launched on other Space Shuttles. Three follow-up Boeing-built satellites were launched by Atlas rockets in 2000 and 2002. A NASA Press Release summarized the capabilities of the system as a whole:

"Working solo, TDRS-1 provided more communication coverage, in support of the September 1983 Shuttle mission, than the entire network of NASA tracking stations had provided in all previous Shuttle missions."

The first generation of TDRS are planned to be retired in 2015.

TDRSS ground terminals
The two TDRSS satellite ground terminals are located at NASA White Sands Complex, which is in the Las Cruces area. All radioed commands and received telemetry that go to and from the tracking and data relay satellites go by way of these terminals at the White Sands Complex. At first, just one large ground terminal system for the TDRSS was designed and built. Thus, there are now two functionally identical and redundant satellite ground terminals there, which are known as the White Sands Complex. Due to a Zone of Exclusion, no user support over the Indian Ocean, a ground terminal was built in Guam to support TDRS.

Bilateration ranging transponder system 
The bilateration ranging transponder system (BRTS) provides tracking support for TDRS spacecraft. BRTS consists of four sites located at White Sands Missile Range (WSC), Guam (GRGT), Ascension Island (ACN), and Alice Springs, Australia (ALS).

Design
The communications systems of the TDRSS satellites were designed to support multiple missions at the same time. Each satellite has S band, Ku band (1st Gen only), and Ka band (2nd gen only) electronic communication systems hardware that operate at different carrier frequencies and also support various data-rates. The newer Boeing satellites are able to support more communications than the older TRW-built satellites.

Different versions of the TDRS 
 Section source: NASA TDRSS official site
 First generation TDRS: models A to G
 Second generation TDRS: models H to J
 Third generation TDRS: models K to M
 Launch site: Cape Canaveral, United States
 Launch vehicle: Space Shuttle, Atlas II or Atlas V booster
 Mass: 2108.0 kg
 Nominal power: 1700.0W

Launch history 
 Sub-section source: NSSDC Master Catalog Display: Spacecraft

Note: while a TDRSS satellite is in the manufacturing process it is given a letter designation, but once it has successfully achieved the correct geosynchronous orbit it is referred to with a number (for example, TDRS-A during development and before on-orbit acceptance, and TDRS-1 after acceptance on orbit and put into operational use). Thus, satellites that are lost in launch failures or have massive malfunctions are never numbered.

TDRS background
Source: NASA: TDRS A Satellite
TDRS-A was the first of TDRSS multiple satellite tracking system. The system is a concept utilizing communication satellite technology that improves and economizes the satellite tracking and telemetry operations. The base three geosynchronous satellites (one a standby) track and receive data from satellites for relay to a ground station. The two primary active satellites are separated in orbit by at least 130 degrees longitude.

One system is used for tracking satellites with apogees below 2000 km (the great majority of satellites), and the other for those with higher apogees. Use of operating frequencies near 2150 (plus or minus 150) MHz and near 14.3 (plus or minus 0.9) GHz were the initial plan.

TDRSS was originally intended to support satellites with apogees below 12,000 km. Spacecraft in the TDRSS require only one communications system, since ground-based telemetry stations will be compatible with TDRSS equipment.

Gallery

See also

 TDRS GSFC NASA page
 SCaN Program
 European Data Relay System
 Luch (satellite)
 Indian Data Relay Satellite System
 Space Network
 Deep Space Network
 Near Earth Network
 Eastern Range

References

Notes
 NASA's Goddard Space Flight Center TDRS K/L Official Page
 NASA's Goddard Space Flight Center Space Network Official Page

External links
 NASA's TDRSS program overview page
 Boeing 2nd Generation
 Boeing 3rd Generation

Communications satellites
 
Satellites of the United States
Articles containing video clips
Satellites by type